The Lady Godiva device was an unshielded, pulsed nuclear reactor originally situated at the Los Alamos National Laboratory (LANL), near Santa Fe, New Mexico. It was one of a number of criticality devices within Technical Area 18 (TA-18). Specifically, it was used to produce bursts of neutrons and gamma rays for irradiating test samples, and inspired development of Godiva-like reactors.

The burst of radiation was produced when a piston of fissile material was quickly inserted into and extracted from a cavity within the larger fissile mass. During the time these two masses were combined, they formed a critical mass and a nuclear chain reaction was briefly sustained.

Godiva's design was inspired by a self terminating property  discovered when incorrectly experimenting with the Jemima device in 1952. Jemima operated by remotely lifting one stack of enriched uranium-235 disks up towards another, fixed, stack. On 18 April 1952, due to a miscalculation, Jemima was assembled with too many disks; this caused an excursion of 1.5 x 1016 fissions—an automatic scram—but no damage.

On 3 February 1954 and 12 February 1957, accidental criticality excursions occurred causing damage to the device, but only insignificant exposures to personnel. This original Godiva device, known as Lady Godiva, was irreparable after the second accident and was replaced by the Godiva II.

Godiva II

Godiva II was constructed inside a concrete building with  walls and  roof in a canyon a quarter-mile (400 m) away from the control room.

In 1959, Los Alamos agreed to make Godiva II available to DOD contractors free of charge for 2 days each month, acknowledging its unique facility for radiation tests.

Godiva's success in creating intense bursts spurred development of similar pulsed reactors, which also suffered accidental excursions, for example: 28 May 1965 at the White Sands Missile Range (parts were thrown ); and 6 September 1968 at the Aberdeen Proving Ground (middle melted, disks warped and bolts stretched).

In December 2002, the U.S. Department of Energy announced it was to move its TA-18 testing equipment including the Godiva burst machine from the LANL to the Device Assembly Facility (DAF) at the Nevada Test Site (NTS).

See also
Flattop (critical assembly)

Notes

Explanatory notes

Citations

General references

 
 
  id=UCRL-TR-214269
 
 McLaughlin et al. 
 LA-13638 covers United States, Russia, United Kingdom, and Japan, and is also available here and at this page, which also tries to track down documents referenced in the report.
 U.S. Department of Energy. 
  OSTI ID: 4268715

External links

 

Nuclear reactors
Nuclear research reactors
Los Alamos National Laboratory
Nevada Test Site
Nuclear accidents and incidents in the United States